John Cleary may refer to:

John Cleary (actor) from List of Australian films of 1974
John Cleary (Canadian politician) (1932–2012), Ontario state politician
John Cleary (Gaelic footballer) (born 1963), Irish footballer
John Cleary (golfer) in Connecticut Open
John Cleary (New South Wales politician) (1883–1962), Australian politician
John Cleary (Rockland County, NY) in 104th New York State Legislature
John Cleary (radio presenter) in 612 ABC Brisbane
John Cleary (rugby league) from List of Australia national rugby league team players
John G. Cleary (1950–2014), New Zealand-Canadian computer scientist
John Henry Cleary (1854–1937), Australian politician from Tasmania
John M. Cleary (1869–1948), American lawyer, judge and politician
(Thomas) John Cleary (born 1947), Australian politician from Tasmania

See also
Jon Cleary (1917–2010), Australian writer
Jon Cleary (musician) (born 1962), American funk musician